Nazira Aytbekova is a presenter for Kyrgyzstan state television. In 2012, she was reported to have been kidnapped at gunpoint and subjected to a mock execution. Reports stated that her attackers claimed the attack was a "practical joke" for another media outlet.

References 

Kyrgyzstani television presenters
Living people
Year of birth missing (living people)
Place of birth missing (living people)